Nowhere is a 1997 American black comedy drama film written and directed by Gregg Araki. Described as "Beverly Hills 90210 on acid", the film follows a day in the lives of a group of Los Angeles college students and the strange lives that they lead. It stars an ensemble cast led by James Duval and Rachel True.

The film is Araki's sixth overall and third entry in his Teenage Apocalypse film trilogy, preceded by Totally Fucked Up (1993) and The Doom Generation (1995). Like the other films in the trilogy, it contains scenes of graphic violence and sexuality. The film notably includes several cast members on the verge of stardom, including  Ryan Phillippe, Mena Suvari, Kathleen Robertson, and Denise Richards.

Initial reception was mixed, though in subsequent years it has garnered a cult status and its reputation among critics has grown.

Plot

Dark and Mel are a bisexual couple in an open relationship. Mel is dating a girl named Lucifer, who Dark hates, while Dark is interested in a mysterious boy he keeps running into named Montgomery. The three of them meet up at a café they frequent, where we're introduced to other teens they know, such as Alyssa, Dingbat and Egg and Dark's friend Cowboy, and they discuss a party being held that night by a man they know named Jujyfruit.  Egg runs into an unnamed TV star from Baywatch (played by Baywatch actor Jaason Simmons).

Cowboy tells Dark about the heroin addiction his boyfriend Bart suffers with. He offers Bart the chance to fix their relationship if he stops using drugs, but he declines.  Alyssa and Dingbat meet with Ducky, Egg's brother and Dingbat's crush, before Alyssa meets up with her boyfriend Elvis. While waiting at a bus stop, Dark sees three valley girls killed by an alien, which he tries to catch on video before it disappears.

At the Baywatch star's place, he and Egg watch TV together before he tries to make a move on her. She rejects his advances, angering him and leading to him raping her.  Dark and his friends play a drugged out game of hide and seek, during which Montgomery gets abducted by the same alien from earlier, who Dark runs into in a locker room. Egg and Bart both return home and watch the same televangelist, Moses Helper, on TV, who encourages the two to commit suicide in order to reach heaven.

When he fails to convince Mel to become monogamous at Jujyfruit's party, Dark goes outside and is joined by Dingbat. Suddenly Ducky, after hearing about his sister's suicide, leaps into a swimming pool, with Dingbat using CPR to resuscitate him. Going back into the party, Dark enters a kitchen where he sees the same alien from earlier. He meets with Handjob and begins to tell him about his day before Alyssa and Elvis arrive. Elvis claims Handjob sold him cut drugs and beats him to death with a can of tomato soup.

Dark returns home and records a diary entry on his video camera, saying how he's "totally doomed". As he attempts to sleep, Montgomery knocks on his window. Dark lets him in as he explains that he was abducted and experimented on by aliens who intend to invade Earth. The two lie down in bed together and Montgomery asks if he can spend the night, with Dark agreeing only if he promises to never leave. The two close their eyes but are disturbed, as Montgomery goes into a coughing fit, then explodes into a shower of blood, leaving only a cockroach-like alien who exclaims, "I'm outta here," before crawling out of the window. A blood-covered Dark turns to the audience, staring with his mouth wide open. In a brief scene after the credits, Dark yells out "No!"

Cast

Reception
The film received mixed reviews from critics.
The Los Angeles Times gave the film a positive review, calling it "high energy" and stating that "Araki is a marvel at controlling shifting tones, and Nowhere, a confident, intricate work, has a great pop art look, yet its emotions are real." In an article on the upcoming summer films of 1997, The New York Times described Nowhere as "California's version of Kids."

Writing for Empire, Jake Hamilton gave the film a negative review, stating "True, there are some dazzling scenes; a brilliant intercutting sex-scene; death by a Campbell's soup tin and a ridiculously absurd finale, but compared to the likes of Richard Linklater's endearing Dazed and Confused, Nowhere is completely lost up its own arse."

Home media
In the US, it was released on VHS. Elsewhere it is available on DVD, including the United Kingdom, where it was released on a Region 2 DVD with no special features..  It was later re-released in the United Kingdom in 2013 featuring a commentary track with Gregg Araki James Duval, Rachel True and Jordan Ladd.  In France it was released in a Region 2 DVD, with either French audio or original audio with French subtitles. It has no special features except for a French trailer.  In Australia it was released on a Region 4 DVD.

Soundtrack
The soundtrack to the film, Nowhere: Music from the Gregg Araki Movie, was released on Mercury Records in 1997.

Track listing
 Intro
 311 – "Freak Out"
 Radiohead – "How Can You Be Sure"
 Elastica – "In the City"
 Hole – "Dicknail"
 The Chemical Brothers – "Life is Sweet" (Daft Punk Remix)
 Massive Attack – "Daydreaming" (Blacksmith Remix)
 Coco and the Bean – "Killing Time" (Qureysh – Eh? 1 Remix)
 Catherine Wheel – "Intravenous"
 Curve – "Nowhere"
 Lush – "I Have the Moon"
Ruby – "Flippin' Tha Bird" (Ceasefire Remix)
 James – "Thursday Treatments"
 Chuck D – "Generation Wrekked" (Danny Saber Rock Remix)
 Marilyn Manson – "Kiddie Grinder" (Remix)
 Suede – "Trash"

Songs featured in the movie that do not appear on the soundtrack album include:

 Slowdive – "Avalyn II"
 Stacy Q - "Two of Hearts"
 Cocteau Twins - "Seekers Who Are Lovers"
 Babyland - "Five Fingers"
 Scylla - "Get A Helmet"
 Sonic Youth - "Hendrix Necro"
 The Future Sound of London - "Papua New Guinea"
 Blur - "She's so High"
 The Verve - "Grey Skies"
 Nine Inch Nails - "Memorabilia"
 Mojave 3 - "Tryin' To Reach You"
 Filter - "Take Another"
 Seefeel - "Air-Eyes"
 The Jesus & Mary Chain - "In The Black"
 Nitzer Ebb - "Kick It"
 Seefeel - "Time To Find Me"
 Portishead - "Mourning Air"
 Adorable - "Vendetta"
 Red Kross - "Out Of My Tree"
 Coil - "The Snow: Answers Come In Dreams"
 My Life With The Thrill Kill Kult - "The Next Room Of The Dream"
 Flying Saucer Attack - "Land Beyond The Sun"
 Filter - "Dose"
 The The - "Love Is Stronger Than Death"

Here Now (2015)

In 2015, fashion house Kenzo commissioned a new short film from Gregg Araki that would feature the label's winter campaign. The short, titled Here Now, serves as a sequel to Nowhere and is set sometime soon after the film's events

References

External links
 

1997 films
1997 comedy-drama films
1997 LGBT-related films
1990s black comedy films
1990s teen comedy-drama films
American black comedy films
American comedy-drama films
American LGBT-related films
American independent films
American teen comedy-drama films
American teen LGBT-related films
Bisexuality-related films
1990s English-language films
Films about drugs
Films directed by Gregg Araki
Films produced by Andrea Sperling
LGBT-related black comedy films
LGBT-related comedy-drama films
LGBT-related science fiction films
1990s American films